Elections to Runnymede Council were held on 1 May 2008. One third of the council was up for election and the Conservative Party stayed in overall control of the council.

Three councillors had resigned from the council before the election and a further two did not stand for re-election. No seats changed hands with the Conservative party remaining dominant on the council.

After the election, the composition of the council was:
Conservative 36
Runnymede Residents Association 6

Election result

Ward results

References

2008 Runnymede election result
Ward results

2008
2008 English local elections
2000s in Surrey